All Flowers in Time is a 2010 short surrealist horror film directed by Jonathan Caouette. The plot centers on a television signal that possesses young children, making them believe they can transform into other people or monsters. The film stars Chloë Sevigny and has been screened at several film festivals as of Fall 2010. Although it shares a similar name, the film's title is not directly connected to the Jeff Buckley song, "All Flowers in Time Bend Towards the Sun".

Release
The film premiered at Cannes Film Festival in Cannes, France in May 2010 and has since been screened at several festivals, including: New York Film Fest, BFI London Film Festival, ZeroFilm Fest, Sundance, and the Portland International Film Festival. The film was also shown before Darren Aronofsky's Black Swan (2010) at Cinema du Parc in December 2010.

References

External links
 
 

2010s English-language films
2010 films
2010 horror films
Films directed by Jonathan Caouette
2010 short films
American horror short films
2010s American films